Crooked Hearts is a 1991 American drama film written and directed by Michael Bortman. The film stars Vincent D'Onofrio, Jennifer Jason Leigh, Peter Berg, Cindy Pickett, Juliette Lewis, Noah Wyle and Peter Coyote. The film was released on September 6, 1991, by Metro-Goldwyn-Mayer.

Plot
Tom Warren returns home from Berkeley College where he dropped out. Tom returns to the family where the close knit family celebrated their misfortunes and bad luck at yearly parties. Charlie the oldest brother holds a secret that could rip the family apart. The film centers around this secret and the Warren family.

Cast
Vincent D'Onofrio as Charley Warren
Jennifer Jason Leigh as Marriet Hoffman
Peter Berg as Tom Warren
Cindy Pickett as Jill Warren
Juliette Lewis as Cassie Warren
Noah Wyle as Ask Warren
Peter Coyote as Edward Warren
Wendy Gazelle as Eileen
Marg Helgenberger as Jennetta
Deanna Milligan as Julie 
Sacha Moiseiwitsch as Bonita
Joshua Jackson as Tom 
Ryan Jorgenson as Ask
Ian Tracey as Limber Watkins
Vincent Gale as Charley's Friend
Doreen Ramus as Woman in Bakery
David Longworth as Gas Station Owner
Babs Chula as Neighbor Woman
Dee Jay Jackson as Fire Captain 
Curt Bonn as Fireman
Kenneth Kantymir as John Heffel
John Kernahan as Driver

References

External links 
 
 

1991 films
American drama films
1991 drama films
Metro-Goldwyn-Mayer films
A&M Films films
Films scored by Mark Isham
1990s English-language films
1990s American films